Bronsart von Schellendorff or Bronsart von Schellendorf is a surname. Notable people with the surname include:

Fritz Bronsart von Schellendorf (1864–1942), German officer and politician
Hans Bronsart von Schellendorff (1830–1913), classical musician and composer who studied under Franz Liszt
Heinrich-Walter Bronsart von Schellendorff (1906–1944), highly decorated Generalmajor in the Wehrmacht during World War II
Ingeborg Bronsart von Schellendorf, (born 1840), Swedish-German composer
Paul Bronsart von Schellendorff (1832–1891), Prussian general and writer
Walther Bronsart von Schellendorff (1833–1914), Prussian Minister of War